Kailarsenia is a genus of flowering plants in the tribe Gardenieae of the family Rubiaceae. Its native range is Indo-China to West Malesia.

Kailarsenia belongs to the "Gardenia" clade, together with Aoranthe pro parte, Ceriscoides, Coddia, Gardenia, and Genipa.

The genus name Kailarsenia is a taxonomic patronym honoring Kai Larsen, professor of botany at Århus University, Denmark. The closely related genus Larsenaikia has been named as a taxonomic anagram derived from Kailarsenia.

References 

Rubiaceae genera
Plants described in 1983
Gardenieae